Galion Municipal Airport  is three miles northeast of Galion in Crawford County, Ohio. The FAA's National Plan of Integrated Airport Systems for 2009–2013 classified it as a general aviation airport.

Facilities
Its runway, 5/23, is 3,505 by 75 feet (1,068 x 23 m).

In the year ending June 29, 2009 the airport had 6,216 aircraft operations, average 17 per day: 99.7% general aviation and 0.3% military. 31 aircraft were then based at this airport, all single-engine.
Galion Municipal Airport had airline service in the 1960s,70s, and 80s. Fischer Brothers Aviation was an Allegheny Commuter based at Galion. They flew De Havilland Herons & Doves & then bought the larger Casa 212 airplanes in the early 1980s . The service was a very short, 5 minute flight to/from Mansfield (MFD) where they would continue on to Cleveland Hopkins (CLE). The airline continued to grow to Columbus (CMH), Detroit (DTW) & other Midwestern cities.

References

External links 
 Aerial photo as of 15 March 1995 from USGS The National Map
 

Airports in Ohio
Buildings and structures in Richland County, Ohio
Transportation in Richland County, Ohio